Horkelia daucifolia is a species of flowering plant in the rose family known by the common name carrotleaf horkelia. It is native to the Klamath Mountains and surrounding ranges in northern California and southern Oregon. It grows on mountain slopes and fields, often on serpentine soils. It is a perennial herb that produces a rosette of leaves, each five to 15 centimeters long. Each leaf is made up of lobed, hairy leaflets that are one or two centimeters long. The plant produces erect stems up to 30 centimeters tall and bright red or greenish in color. The inflorescence holds several flowers, each with narrow, pointed bractlets and wider, reflexed green or pinkish sepals. The five narrow petals are white, yellow, or pink.

External links
Jepson Manual Treatment
Photo gallery

daucifolia
Flora of California
Flora of Oregon
Flora without expected TNC conservation status